Handbollsligan (literally, "The Handball league") is the highest league in the league system of Swedish handball, and comprises the top 14 Swedish handball teams. The first season began in 1931–32. The season ends with a playoff.

Structure
The season starts in September with a regular season comprising 14 teams meeting each other twice. A total of 26 rounds. The eight best teams after the regular season qualifies for the play-off. The 14th team is relegated, and the 11th, 12th and 13th team plays matches against the second, third and fourth from Allsvenskan to qualify for next season's Handbollsligan.

The season ends with the finals in the beginning of May and the winning team qualifies directly to EHF European League and the losing team qualifies for the EHF European Cup.

Teams for season 2022–23

Swedish Champions

1931–32 – Flottans IF Karlskrona
1932–33 – Redbergslids IK
1933–34 – Redbergslids IK
1934–35 – Majornas IK
1935–36 – SoIK Hellas
1936–37 – SoIK Hellas
1937–38 – Västerås IK
1938–39 – Uppsala Studenters IF
1939–40 – Majornas IK
1940–41 – IFK Kristianstad
1941–42 – Majornas IK
1942–43 – Majornas IK
1943–44 – Majornas IK
1944–45 – Majornas IK
1945–46 – Majornas IK
1946–47 – Redbergslids IK
1947–48 – IFK Kristianstad
1948–49 – IFK Lidingö
1949–50 – IK Heim
1950–51 – AIK Handboll
1951–52 – IFK Kristianstad
1952–53 – IFK Kristianstad
1953–54 – Redbergslids IK
1954–55 – IK Heim
1955–56 – Örebro SK
1956–57 – Örebro SK
1957–58 – Redbergslids IK
1958–59 – IK Heim
1989-60 – IK Heim
1960–61 – Vikingarnas IF
1961–62 – IK Heim
1962–63 – Redbergslids IK
1963–64 – Redbergslids IK
1964–65 – Redbergslids IK
1965–66 – IS Göta
1966–67 – Vikingarnas IF
1967–68 – IF Saab
1968–69 – SoIK Hellas
1969–70 – SoIK Hellas
1970–71 – SoIK Hellas
1971–72 – SoIK Hellas
1972–73 – IF Saab
1973–74 – IF Saab
1974–75 – HK Drott
1975–76 – Ystads IF
1976–77 – SoIK Hellas
1977–78 – HK Drott
1978–79 – HK Drott
1979–80 – LUGI HF
1980–81 – Vikingarnas IF
1981–82 – IK Heim
1982–83 – IK Heim
1983–84 – HK Drott
1984–85 – Redbergslids IK
1985–86 – Redbergslids IK
1986–87 – Redbergslids IK
1987–88 – HK Drott
1988–89 – Redbergslids IK
1989–90 – HK Drott
1990–91 – HK Drott
1991–92 – Ystads IF
1992–93 – Redbergslids IK
 
1993–94 – HK Drott
1994–95 – Redbergslids IK
1995–96 – Redbergslids IK
1996–97 – Redbergslids IK
1997–98 – Redbergslids IK
1998–99 – HK Drott
1999-00 – Redbergslids IK
2000–01 – Redbergslids IK
2001–02 – HK Drott
2002–03 – Redbergslids IK
2003–04 – IK Sävehof
2004–05 – IK Sävehof
2005–06 – Hammarby IF
2006–07 – Hammarby IF
2007–08 – Hammarby IF
2008–09 – Alingsås HK
2009–10 – IK Sävehof
2010–11 – IK Sävehof
2011–12 – IK Sävehof
2012–13 – HK Drott
2013–14 – Alingsås HK
2014–15 – IFK Kristianstad
2015–16 – IFK Kristianstad
2016–17 – IFK Kristianstad
2017–18 – IFK Kristianstad
2018–19 – IK Sävehof
2019–20 – Cancelled (COVID-19)
2020–21 – IK Sävehof
2021–22 – Ystads IF

EHF coefficient ranking

For season 2015/2016, see footnote

7.  (11)  PGNiG Superliga Mężczyzn (38.60)
8.  (10)  Macedonian Super Liga (36.40)
9.  (14)  Elitserien (36.33)
10.  (12)  Belarusian First League (33.90)
11.  (8)  Swiss Handball League (33.00)

Seasonal Coefficient Ranking Graph :

References

External links
 Swedish handball association 
 Swedish men's handball league official website

Handball competitions in Sweden
Sweden
Hand
Professional sports leagues in Sweden